Pfäffikersee (or Lake Pfäffikon) is a lake in the canton of Zürich, Switzerland, near the town of Pfäffikon. It is 2.5 km long and 1.3 km wide at the middle. The lake was created in the last ice age when a moraine blocked off the ability for the lake to empty north towards Winterthur. There is also a hiking trail around the lake that people often bike and walk on, and the area is considered protected lands, among them the Robenhauser Ried and the prehistoric settlement Wetzikon–Robenhausen, discovered and researched by Jakob Messikommer (1828–1917), which became a serial site of the UNESCO World Heritage Site Prehistoric pile dwellings around the Alps. In Roman era, along Pfäffikersee there was a Roman road from the vicus Centum Prata (Kempraten) on Obersee–Lake Zürich via Vitudurum (Oberwinterthur) to Tasgetium (Eschenz) to the Rhine. To secure this important transport route, the Irgenhausen Castrum was built.

See also
List of lakes of Switzerland

External links 

Waterlevels of Pfäffikersee at Pfäffikon

 
Pfaffikon
Lakes of the canton of Zürich
High Rhine basin
Wetzikon
Pfäffikon, Zürich
LPfaffikersee
Seegräben